The 2005–06 season was the 92nd season in Aris Thessaloniki F.C.'s existence. The club finished 3rd in the Beta Ethniki and promoted to Super League for the next season.

Aris Thessaloniki was eliminated in Second round of Greek Football Cup by Panthrakikos.

As runners-up of the Greek Cup in previous season, Aris Thessaloniki qualified in to First round of UEFA Cup. The club were eliminated by the Italian Roma.

Competitions

Overall

Overview

{| class="wikitable" style="text-align: center"
|-
!rowspan=2|Competition
!colspan=8|Record
|-
!
!
!
!
!
!
!
!
|-
| Beta Ethniki

|-
| Greek Cup

|-
| UEFA Cup

|-
! Total

Beta Ethniki

League table

Greek Cup

Matches

Squad statistics

Appearances

Players with no appearances not included in the list.

Goals

References

  rsssf.com – Greece 2005/06

External links

Greek football clubs 2005–06 season
2005-06